The Volkswagen ID. Crozz is an electric concept car based on Volkswagen's electric MEB platform, and part of the ID. series. It was first shown as a prototype at the 2017 Shanghai Auto Show. A revised version, named the "ID. Crozz II", was shown at the 2017 Frankfurt Auto Show. A hint of the ID. Crozz production version was also promised for the 2019 Frankfurt Motor Show, alongside the debut of the ID.3 and the next generation E-up.

The VW ID.4, a production vehicle based on the ID. Crozz prototype was launched on 23 September 2020.

It will be one of nine new Volkswagen brand models based on the MEB platform.

See also
 Volkswagen ID. series
 Volkswagen ID. Buzz

References

ID.